The 1940 Hong Kong Urban Council election was held on 29 February 1940 for the one of the two unofficial seats in the Urban Council of Hong Kong. It was the first contested election since the establishment of the Urban Council of Hong Kong and also the last one before the outbreak of the Pacific War. The next election to be held would be the 1952 election, twelve years later.

Overview
Only ratepayers who were included in the Special and Common Jury Lists of the years or ratepayers who are exempted from serving on Juries on account of their professional avocations, unofficial members of the Executive or Legislative Council, or categories of profession were entitled to vote at the election.

The two candidates were both from the Portuguese community in Hong Kong. Incumbent Dr. Roberto Alexandre de Castro Basto was proposed by the Hon. Sir Henry Pollock, K.C., LL.D., seconded by Major C. M. Manners, O.B.E. had held three terms of officer of three years each on the Urban Council which expired a few weeks ago. Dr. Alberto Maria Rodrigues, a University of Hong Kong graduate who later became the Senior Unofficial Member of the Executive Council, was proposed by Mr. Leo D'Almada e Castro, Snr., seconded by Lt.-Col. H. B. L. Dowbiggin, O.B.E.

The election took place in the office of the Registrar of the Supreme Court from 10 a.m. to 6 p.m. on 29 February. 682 eligible voters cast their votes but nine of them were declared invalid for various reasons. The Presiding Officer at the election was the Registrar Mr. L. R. Andrewes, assisted by Mr. W. R. N. Andrews, Miss Grace Ezra and three clerks.

Dr. Rodrigues defeated the incumbent Dr. R. A. de Castro Basto by 407 votes to 266 votes as the result.

Citations

References
 Endacott, G. B. Government and people in Hong Kong, 1841-1962: a Constitutional History Hong Kong University Press. (1964) 
 The Hong Kong Government Gazette

Hong Kong
1940 in Hong Kong
Urban
February 1940 events
1940 elections in the British Empire